Microstelma oshikatai is a species of minute sea snail, a marine gastropod micromollusk in the family Zebinidae.

References

Zebinidae